Dilek is a Turkish word meaning wish, request or desire. It is used as a feminine given name as well as a noun and may refer to:

Given name
 Dilek Akagün Yılmaz (born 1963), Turkish politician
 Dilek Gürsoy (born 1976), German heart surgeon of Turkish descent
Dilek Kalayci (born 1967), Turkish–German politician
 Dilek Kınık (born 1995), Turkish volleyball player
 Dilek Koçbay (born 1982), Turkish FIFA listed football referee
 Dilek Sabanci, Turkish executive and a member of the Sabancı family
 Dilek Serbest (born 1981), Turkish actress and model

Places
 Dilek, Köprüköy
 Dilek, Malatya, a town in the central district of Malatya Province, Turkey
 Dilek, Taşköprü, a village in Turkey
 Dilek Peninsula, a peninsula lying between the districts of Didim and Kuşadası in Aydın Province, western Turkey
 Dilek Peninsula-Büyük Menderes Delta National Park, a national park in Aydın province, Turkey
 Dilek Sabancı Sport Hall, a sports hall in Antalya, Turkey

Other uses
 Dilek Ecza Deposu, fifth largest-pharmaceutical warehouse in Turkey

References

Turkish feminine given names